Nauru (  or), officially the Republic of Nauru and formerly known as Pleasant Island, is an island country and microstate in Oceania, in the Central Pacific. With only a  area, Nauru is the third-smallest country in the world behind Vatican City and Monaco, making it the smallest republic as well as the smallest island nation. Its population of about 10,000 is the world's second-smallest (not including colonies or overseas territories), after Vatican City.

Settled by people from Micronesia circa 1000 BCE, Nauru was annexed and claimed as a colony by the German Empire in the late 19th century. After World War I, Nauru became a League of Nations mandate administered by Australia, New Zealand, and the United Kingdom. During World War II, Nauru was occupied by Japanese troops, and was bypassed by the Allied advance across the Pacific. After the war ended, the country entered into United Nations trusteeship. Nauru gained its independence in 1968, and became a member of the Pacific Community (PC) in 1969.

Nauru is a phosphate-rock island with rich deposits near the surface, which allowed easy strip mining operations for over a century, though at the cost of seriously harming the island's environment, causing the island nation to suffer from what is often referred to as the "resource curse". The phosphate was exhausted in the 1990s, and the remaining reserves are not economically viable for extraction. A trust established to manage the island's accumulated mining wealth, set up for the day the reserves would be exhausted, has diminished in value. To earn income, Nauru briefly became a tax haven and illegal money laundering centre. At various points since 2001, it has accepted aid from the Australian Government in exchange for hosting the Nauru Regional Processing Centre, a controversial offshore Australian immigration detention facility. As a result of heavy dependence on Australia, some sources have identified Nauru as a client state of Australia. The sovereign state is a member of the United Nations, the Commonwealth of Nations, and the Organization of African, Caribbean, and Pacific States.

History 

Nauru was first settled by Micronesians at least 3,000 years ago, and there is evidence of possible Polynesian influence. Comparatively little is known of Nauruan prehistory, although the island is believed to have had a long period of isolation, which accounts for the distinct language that developed among the inhabitants. There were traditionally 12 clans or tribes on Nauru, which are represented in the twelve-pointed star on the country's flag. Traditionally, Nauruans traced their descent matrilineally. Inhabitants practised aquaculture: they caught juvenile milkfish (known as ibija in Nauruan), acclimatised them to freshwater, and raised them in the Buada Lagoon, providing a reliable food source. The other locally grown components of their diet included coconuts and pandanus fruit. The name "Nauru" may derive from the Nauruan word , which means 'I go to the beach.'

In 1798, the British sea captain John Fearn, on his trading ship Hunter (300 tons), became the first Westerner to report sighting Nauru, calling it "Pleasant Island", because of its attractive appearance. From at least 1826, Nauruans had regular contact with Europeans on whaling and trading ships who called for provisions and fresh drinking water. The last whaler to call during the age of sail visited in 1904.

Around this time, deserters from European ships began to live on the island. The islanders traded food for alcoholic palm wine and firearms. The firearms were used during the 10-year Nauruan Civil War that began in 1878.

After an agreement with Great Britain, Nauru was annexed by Germany in 1888 and incorporated into Germany's Marshall Islands Protectorate for administrative purposes. The arrival of the Germans ended the civil war, and kings were established as rulers of the island. The most widely known of these was King Auweyida. Christian missionaries from the Gilbert Islands arrived in 1888. The German settlers called the island "Nawodo" or "Onawero". The Germans ruled Nauru for almost three decades. Robert Rasch, a German trader who married a Nauruan woman, was the first administrator, appointed in 1890.

Phosphate was discovered on Nauru in 1900 by the prospector Albert Fuller Ellis. The Pacific Phosphate Company began to exploit the reserves in 1906 by agreement with Germany, exporting its first shipment in 1907. In 1914, following the outbreak of World War I, Nauru was captured by Australian troops. In 1919, it was agreed by the Allied and Associated Powers that His Britannic Majesty should be the administering authority under a League of Nations mandate. The Nauru Island Agreement forged in 1919 between the governments of the United Kingdom, Australia, and New Zealand provided for the administration of the island and extraction of the phosphate deposits by an intergovernmental British Phosphate Commission (BPC). The terms of the League of Nations mandate were drawn up in 1920.

The island experienced an influenza epidemic and ongoing colonial strife through the early 20th century, with a mortality rate of 18 per cent among native Nauruans. In 1923, the League of Nations gave Australia a trustee mandate over Nauru, with the United Kingdom and New Zealand as co-trustees. On 6 and 7 December 1940, the German auxiliary cruisers Komet and Orion sank five supply ships in the vicinity of Nauru. Komet then shelled Nauru's phosphate mining areas, oil storage depots, and the shiploading cantilever.

Japanese troops occupied Nauru on 25 August 1942. The Japanese built 2 airfields which were bombed for the first time on 25 March 1943, preventing food supplies from being flown to Nauru. The Japanese deported 1,200 Nauruans to work as labourers in the Chuuk Islands, which was also occupied by Japan. As part of the Allied strategy of island hopping from the Pacific islands towards the main islands of Japan, Nauru was bypassed and left to "wither on the vine". Nauru was finally liberated on 13 September 1945, when commander Hisayaki Soeda surrendered the island to the Australian Army and the Royal Australian Navy. The surrender was accepted by Brigadier J. R. Stevenson, who represented Lieutenant General Vernon Sturdee, the commander of the First Australian Army, aboard the warship HMAS Diamantina. Arrangements were made to repatriate from Chuuk the 745 Nauruans who survived Japanese captivity there. They were returned to Nauru by the BPC ship Trienza in January 1946.

In 1947, a trusteeship was established by the United Nations, with Australia, New Zealand, and the United Kingdom as trustees. Under those arrangements, the UK, Australia, and New Zealand were a joint administering authority. The Nauru Island Agreement provided for the first administrator to be appointed by Australia for five years, leaving subsequent appointments to be decided by the three governments. However, in practice, administrative power was exercised by Australia alone.

The 1948 Nauru riots occurred when Chinese guano mining workers went on strike over pay and conditions. The Australian administration imposed a state of emergency with Native Police and armed volunteers of locals and Australian officials being mobilised. This force, using sub-machine guns and other firearms, opened fire on the Chinese workers killing two and wounding sixteen. Around 50 of the workers were arrested and two of these were bayoneted to death while in custody. The trooper who bayoneted the prisoners was charged but later acquitted on grounds that the wounds were "accidentally received." The governments of the Soviet Union and China made official complaints against Australia at the United Nations over this incident.

In 1964, it was proposed to relocate the population of Nauru to Curtis Island off the coast of Queensland, Australia. By that time, Nauru had been extensively mined for phosphate by companies from Australia, Britain, and New Zealand, damaging the landscape so much that it was thought the island would be uninhabitable by the 1990s. Rehabilitating the island was seen as financially impossible. In 1962, Australian Prime Minister Robert Menzies said that the three countries involved in the mining had an obligation to provide a solution for the Nauruan people, and proposed finding a new island for them. In 1963, the Australian Government proposed to acquire all the land on Curtis Island (which was considerably larger than Nauru) and then offer the Nauruans freehold title over the island and that the Nauruans would become Australian citizens. The cost of resettling the Nauruans on Curtis Island was estimated to be  (A$ in ), which included housing and infrastructure and the establishment of pastoral, agricultural, and fishing industries. However, the Nauruan people did not wish to become Australian citizens and wanted to be given sovereignty over Curtis Island to establish themselves as an independent nation, which Australia would not agree to. Nauru rejected the proposal to move to Curtis Island, instead choosing to become an independent nation operating their mines in Nauru.

Nauru became self-governing in January 1966, and following a two-year constitutional convention, it became independent on 31 January 1968 under founding president Hammer DeRoburt. In 1967, the people of Nauru purchased the assets of the British Phosphate Commissioners, and in June 1970 control passed to the locally-owned Nauru Phosphate Corporation (NPC). Income from the mines made Nauruans among the richest people in the world. In 1989, Nauru took legal action against Australia in the International Court of Justice over Australia's administration of the island, in particular, Australia's failure to remedy the environmental damage caused by phosphate mining. Certain Phosphate Lands: Nauru v. Australia led to an out-of-court settlement to rehabilitate the mined-out areas of Nauru.

Geography 

The island is surrounded by a coral reef, which is exposed at low tide and dotted with pinnacles. The presence of the reef has prevented the establishment of a seaport, although channels in the reef allow small boats access to the island.

Coral cliffs surround Nauru's central plateau.

The only fertile areas on Nauru are on the narrow coastal belt, where coconut palms flourish. The land around Buada Lagoon supports bananas, pineapples, vegetables, pandanus trees, and indigenous hardwoods, such as the tamanu tree.

Nauru was one of three great phosphate rock islands in the Pacific Ocean, along with Banaba (Ocean Island), in Kiribati, and Makatea, in French Polynesia. The phosphate reserves on Nauru are now almost entirely depleted. Mining has stripped and devastated about 80 per cent of Nauru's land area, leaving it uninhabitable, and has also affected the surrounding exclusive economic zone; 40 per cent of marine life is estimated to have been killed by silt and phosphate runoff.

There are limited natural sources of freshwater on Nauru. Rooftop storage tanks collect rainwater. The islanders are mostly dependent on three desalination plants housed at Nauru's Utilities Agency.

Climate 
Nauru's climate is hot and very humid year-round because of its proximity to the equator and the ocean. Nauru is hit by monsoon rains between November and February, but rarely has cyclones. Annual rainfall is highly variable and is influenced by the El Niño–Southern Oscillation, with several significant recorded droughts.

Streams and rivers do not exist in Nauru. Water is gathered from roof catchment systems. Water is brought to Nauru as ballast on ships returning for loads of phosphate.

Ecology 

Fauna is sparse on the island because of a lack of vegetation and the consequences of phosphate mining. Many indigenous birds have disappeared or become rare owing to the destruction of their habitat. There are about 60 recorded vascular plant species native to the island, none of which are endemic. Coconut farming, mining, and introduced species have seriously disturbed the native vegetation.

There are no native land mammals, but there are native insects, land crabs, and birds, including the endemic Nauru reed warbler. The Polynesian rat, cats, dogs, pigs, and chickens have been introduced to Nauru from ships. The diversity of the reef marine life makes fishing a popular activity for tourists on the island; also popular are scuba diving and snorkelling.

Politics 

The president of Nauru is Russ Kun, who heads a 19-member unicameral parliament. The country is a member of the United Nations, the Commonwealth of Nations, and the Asian Development Bank. Nauru also participates in the Commonwealth and Olympic Games. Recently Nauru became a member country of the International Renewable Energy Agency (IRENA). The Republic of Nauru became the 189th member of the International Monetary Fund in April 2016.

Nauru is a republic with a parliamentary system of government. The president is both head of state and head of government and is dependent on parliamentary confidence to remain president. All 19 parliament seats are elected every three years. The parliament elects the president from its members, and the president appoints a cabinet of five to six members. As a result of a referendum in 2021, naturalised citizens and their descendants are barred from becoming parliamentarians.

Nauru does not have any formal structure for political parties, and candidates typically stand for office as independents; fifteen of the 19 members of the current Parliament are independents. Four parties that have been active in Nauruan politics are the Nauru Party, the Democratic Party, Nauru First and the Centre Party. However, alliances within the government are often formed based on extended family ties rather than party affiliation.

From 1992 to 1999, Nauru had a local government system known as the Nauru Island Council (NIC). This nine-member council was designed to provide municipal services. The NIC was dissolved in 1999 and all assets and liabilities became vested in the national government. Land tenure on Nauru is unusual: all Nauruans have certain rights to all land on the island, which is owned by individuals and family groups. Government and corporate entities do not own any land, and they must enter into a lease arrangement with landowners to use land. Non-Nauruans cannot own land on the island.

Nauru's Supreme Court, headed by the Chief Justice, is paramount on constitutional issues. Other cases can be appealed to the two-judge Appellate Court. Parliament cannot overturn court decisions. Historically, Appellate Court rulings could be appealed to the High Court of Australia, though this happened only rarely and the Australian court's appellate jurisdiction ended entirely on 12 March 2018 after the Government of Nauru unilaterally ended the arrangement. Lower courts consist of the District Court and the Family Court, both of which are headed by a Resident Magistrate, who also is the Registrar of the Supreme Court. There are two other quasi-courts: the Public Service Appeal Board and the Police Appeal Board, both of which are presided over by the Chief Justice.

Foreign relations 

Following independence in 1968, Nauru joined the Commonwealth of Nations as a Special Member; it became a full member in 1999. The country was admitted to the Asian Development Bank in 1991 and the United Nations in 1999. Nauru is a member of the South Pacific Regional Environment Programme, the Pacific Community, and the South Pacific Applied Geoscience Commission. In February 2021, Nauru announced it would be formally withdrawing from the Pacific Islands Forum in a joint statement with Marshall Islands, Kiribati, and the Federated States of Micronesia after a dispute regarding Henry Puna's election as the Forum's secretary-general.

Nauru has no armed forces, though there is a small police force under civilian control. Australia is responsible for Nauru's defence under an informal agreement between the two countries. The September 2005 memorandum of understanding between Australia and Nauru provides the latter with financial aid and technical assistance, including a Secretary of Finance to prepare the budget, and advisers on health and education. This aid is in return for Nauru's housing of asylum seekers while their applications for entry into Australia are processed. Nauru uses the Australian dollar as its official currency.

Nauru has used its position as a member of the United Nations to gain financial support from both Taiwan (officially the Republic of China or ROC) and mainland China (officially the People's Republic of China or PRC) by changing its recognition from one to the other under the One-China policy. On 21 July 2002, Nauru signed an agreement to establish diplomatic relations with the PRC, accepting US$130 million from the PRC for this action (US$ in ). In response, the ROC severed diplomatic relations with Nauru two days later. Nauru later re-established links with the ROC on 14 May 2005, and diplomatic ties with the PRC were officially severed on 31 May 2005. However, the PRC continues to maintain a representative office on Nauru.

In 2008, Nauru recognised Kosovo as an independent country, and in 2009 Nauru became the fourth country, after Russia, Nicaragua, and Venezuela, to recognise Abkhazia, a breakaway region of Georgia. Russia was reported to be giving Nauru US$50 million in humanitarian aid as a result of this recognition ($ in ). On 15 July 2008, the Nauruan government announced a port refurbishment programme, financed with US$9 million of development aid received from Russia ($ in ). The Nauru government claimed this aid is not related to its recognising Abkhazia and South Ossetia.

A significant portion of Nauru's income has been in the form of aid from Australia. In 2001, the MV Tampa, a Norwegian ship that had rescued 438 refugees from a stranded 20-metre-long boat, was seeking to dock in Australia. In what became known as the Tampa affair, the ship was refused entry and boarded by Australian troops. The refugees were eventually loaded onto Royal Australian Navy vessel HMAS Manoora and taken to Nauru to be held in detention facilities which later became part of the Howard government's Pacific Solution. Nauru operated two detention centres known as State House and Topside for these refugees in exchange for Australian aid. By November 2005, only two refugees, Mohammed Sagar and Muhammad Faisal remained on Nauru from those first sent there in 2001, with Sagar finally resettling in early 2007. The Australian government sent further groups of asylum-seekers to Nauru in late 2006 and early 2007. The refugee centre was closed in 2008, but, following the Australian government's re-adoption of the Pacific Solution in August 2012, it has re-opened it. The US Atmospheric Radiation Measurement program operates a climate-monitoring facility on the island.

In March 2017, at the 34th regular session of the UN Human Rights Council, Vanuatu made a joint statement on behalf of Nauru and some other Pacific nations raising human rights violations in Western New Guinea, which has been occupied by Indonesia since 1963, and requested that the UN High Commissioner for Human Rights produce a report. Indonesia rejected the allegations. More than 100,000 Papuans have died during a 50-year Papua conflict.

Amnesty International has since described the conditions of the refugees of war living in Nauru as a "horror", with reports of children as young as eight attempting suicide and engaging in acts of self-harm. In 2018, the situation gained attention as a "mental health crisis", with an estimated thirty children suffering from traumatic withdrawal syndrome, also known as resignation syndrome.

Administrative divisions 

Nauru is divided into fourteen administrative districts, which are grouped into eight electoral constituencies and are further divided into villages. The most populous district is Denigomodu, with 1,804 residents, of which 1,497 reside in an RONPhos settlement called "Location". The following table shows population by district according to the 2011 census.

Economy 

Before a resurgence in the 2010s, the Nauruan economy was strongest in the 1970s, with GDP peaking in 1981. This trend came from phosphate mining, which accounted for a majority of its economic output. Mining declined starting in the early 1980s. There are few other resources, and most necessities are imported. Small-scale mining is still conducted by RONPhos, formerly known as the Nauru Phosphate Corporation. The government places a percentage of RONPhos's earnings into the Nauru Phosphate Royalties Trust. The trust manages long-term investments, which were intended to support the citizens after the phosphate reserves were exhausted.

Because of mismanagement, the trust's fixed and current assets were reduced considerably and may never fully recover. The failed investments included financing Leonardo the Musical in 1993. The Mercure Hotel in Sydney and Nauru House in Melbourne were sold in 2004 to finance debts and Air Nauru's only Boeing 737 was repossessed in December 2005. Normal air service resumed after the aircraft was replaced with a Boeing 737-300 airliner in June 2006. In 2005, the corporation sold its remaining real estate in Melbourne, the vacant Savoy Tavern site, for $7.5 million (US$ in ).

The value of the trust is estimated to have shrunk from A$1.3 billion in 1991 to A$138 million in 2002 (A$ to A$ in  dollars). Nauru currently lacks money to perform many of the basic functions of government; for example, the National Bank of Nauru is insolvent. The CIA World Factbook estimated a GDP per capita of US$5,000 in 2005. The Asian Development Bank 2007 economic report on Nauru estimated GDP per capita at US$2,400 to US$2,715.

There are no personal taxes in Nauru. The unemployment rate is estimated to be 23 percent and the government employs 95 per cent of those who have jobs. The Asian Development Bank notes that, although the administration has a strong public mandate to implement economic reforms, in the absence of an alternative to phosphate mining, the medium-term outlook is for continued dependence on external assistance. Tourism is not a major contributor to the economy.

In the 1990s, Nauru became a tax haven and offered passports to foreign nationals for a fee. The inter-governmental Financial Action Task Force on Money Laundering (FATF) identified Nauru as one of 15 "non-cooperative" countries in its fight against money laundering. During the 1990s, it was possible to establish a licensed bank in Nauru for only US$25,000 (US$ in ) with no other requirements. Under pressure from FATF, Nauru introduced anti-avoidance legislation in 2003, after which foreign hot money left the country. In October 2005, after satisfactory results from the legislation and its enforcement, FATF lifted the non-cooperative designation.

From 2001 to 2007, the Nauru detention centre provided a significant source of income for the country. The Nauruan authorities reacted with concern to its closure by Australia. In February 2008, the Foreign Affairs minister, Kieren Keke, stated that the closure would result in 100 Nauruans losing their jobs, and would affect 10 per cent of the island's population directly or indirectly: "We have got a huge number of families that are suddenly going to be without any income. We are looking at ways we can try and provide some welfare assistance but our capacity to do that is very limited. Literally we have got a major unemployment crisis in front of us." The detention centre was re-opened in August 2012.

In July 2017 the Organisation for Economic Co-operation and Development (OECD) upgraded its rating of Nauru's standards of tax transparency. Previously Nauru had been listed alongside fourteen other countries that had failed to show that they could comply with international tax transparency standards and regulations. The OECD subsequently put Nauru through a fast-tracked compliance process and the country was given a "largely compliant" rating.

The Nauru 2017–2018 budget, delivered by Minister of Finance David Adeang, forecast A$128.7 million in revenues and A$128.6 million in expenditures and projected modest economic growth for the nation over the next two years. In 2018 the Nauru government partnered with the deep sea mining company DeepGreen, now Nauru Ocean Resources Inc (NORI), a wholly-owned subsidiary of Canadian The Metals Company. They planned to harvest manganese nodules whose minerals and metals can be used in the development of sustainable energy technology.

Population

Demographics 

Nauru had  residents as of July . The population was previously larger, but in 2006 the island saw 1,500 people leave during a repatriation of immigrant workers from Kiribati and Tuvalu. The repatriation was motivated by significant layoffs in phosphate mining.

Nauru is one of the most densely populated Westernized countries in the South Pacific.

Ethnic groups 
Fifty-eight percent of people in Nauru are ethnically Nauruan, 26 percent are other Pacific Islander, 8 percent are European, and 8 percent are Han Chinese.

Languages 
The official languages of Nauru are Nauruan and English. Nauruan  is a distinct Micronesian language, which is spoken by 96 percent of ethnic Nauruans at home. English is widely spoken and is the language of government and commerce.

Religion 

The main religion practised on the island is Christianity (the main denominations are Nauru Congregational Church 35.71%, Roman Catholic 32.96%, Assemblies of God 12.98%, and Baptist 1.48%). The Constitution provides for freedom of religion. The government has restricted the religious practices of the Church of Jesus Christ of Latter-day Saints and the Jehovah's Witnesses, most of whom are foreign workers employed by the government-owned Nauru Phosphate Corporation. The Catholics are pastorally served by the Roman Catholic Diocese of Tarawa and Nauru, with see at Tarawa in Kiribati.

Culture 

Angam Day, held on 26 October, celebrates the recovery of the Nauruan population after the two World Wars and the 1920 influenza epidemic. Colonial and contemporary Western influence has largely displaced the indigenous culture. Few older customs have been preserved, but some forms of traditional music, arts and crafts, and fishing are still practised.

Media 
There are no daily news publications on Nauru, although there is one fortnightly publication, Mwinen Ko. There is a state-owned television station, Nauru Television (NTV), which broadcasts programs from New Zealand and Australia, and a state-owned non-commercial radio station, Radio Nauru, which carries programs from Radio Australia and the BBC.

Sport 

Australian rules football is the most popular sport in Nauru—it and weightlifting are considered the country's national sports. There is an Australian rules football league with eight teams. Other sports popular in Nauru include volleyball, netball, fishing, weightlifting and tennis. Nauru participates in the Commonwealth Games and has participated in the Summer Olympic Games in weightlifting and judo.

Nauru's national basketball team competed at the 1969 Pacific Games, where it defeated the Solomon Islands and Fiji.

The Nauru national rugby sevens team made its international debut at the 2015 Pacific Games.

Nauru competed in the 2015 Oceania Sevens Championship in New Zealand.

Holidays 

Independence Day is celebrated on 31 January.

Public services

Education 

Literacy on Nauru is 96 percent. Education is compulsory for children from six to sixteen years old, and two more non-compulsory years are offered (years 11 and 12). The island has three primary schools and two secondary schools. The secondary schools are Nauru Secondary School and Nauru College. There is a campus of the University of the South Pacific on Nauru. Before this campus was built in 1987, students would study either by distance or abroad. Since 2011, the University of New England, Australia has established a presence on the island with around 30 Nauruan teachers studying for an associate degree in education. These students will continue on to the degree to complete their studies. This project is led by Associate Professor Pep Serow and funded by the Australian Department of Foreign Affairs and Trade.

The previous community public library was destroyed in a fire.  a new one had not yet been built, and no bookmobile services were available as of that year. Sites with libraries include the University of the South Pacific campus, Nauru Secondary, Kayser College, and Aiwo Primary. The Nauru Community Library is in the new University of the South Pacific Nauru Campus building, which was officially opened in May 2018.

Health 
Nauru has one of the highest child mortality rates in the Pacific Island Countries and Territories (PICTs) region at 2.9% in 2020, according to a UNICEF study. 
Life expectancy in Nauru in 2009 was 60.6 years for males and 68.0 years for females.

By measure of mean body mass index (BMI), Nauruans are the most overweight people in the world; 97 percent of men and 93 percent of women are overweight or obese. In 2012, the obesity rate was 71.7 percent. Obesity on the Pacific islands is common.

Nauru has the world's highest level of type 2 diabetes, with more than 40 percent of the population affected. Other significant dietary-related problems on Nauru include kidney disease and heart disease.

Transport

The island is solely served by Nauru International Airport. Passenger service is provided by Nauru Airlines. Flights operate four days a week to Brisbane, with limited service to other destinations including Nadi and Bonriki.

Nauru is accessible by sea via the Nauru International Port. The modernization and expansion project of the former Aiwo Boat Harbor was expected to be completed in 2021 but has been delayed due to technical and logistics issues caused by the COVID-19 pandemic.

Resources

Plants and Farming 
Historically, Indigenous Nauruans kept household gardens that provided much of the food that they needed through subsistence farming, with the most common food plants including coconuts, breadfruit, bananas, pandanus, papaya, and guavas. Because of the large immigrant population that would work in the phosphate mines, there were many types of fruits and vegetables grown that were staples in those countries as well. The soil in Nauru was very rich on what citizens call the "Topside," which is the raised phosphate plateau where the phosphate is mined from, and it was extremely fertile and great for growing crops. However, the area where most Nauruans live now, on the coastal ring on the island that hasn't been mined, the soil quality is among the poorest in the world, as it is shallow, alkaline, and has the coarse texture of the coral that surrounds it. In 2011, just 13% of households maintained a garden or were involved in growing crops. Most of the soil that was on Nauru is now gone because of phosphate-mining activities, leaving people to import the soil that they need. Ethnobotanical studies have indicated that the reduction in the types of plants that can be grown due to phosphate mining has significantly impacted the connection that Indigenous Nauruans feel to the land, as plants are a large part of their cultural identity and have many uses in their lives, with each plant having an average of 7 uses within Pacific Island cultures.

Food 
For Nauru residents today, all food must also be imported because of the loss of 90% of tenable land due to phosphate mining, leaving people with a diet of mainly processed foods, like rice and sugar. Though residents are trying to salvage the soil that they can, some researchers speculate that there will be no regeneration of soils even after the mining ceases. The country's dependence on processed and imported foods along with "cultural, historical and social factors" have greatly affected the health of its citizens. Despite having all food imported, the Household and Income Expenditure Survey (HIES) conducted for the year of 2012–2013 found that Nauruans have a food poverty incidence rate of 0, based on the Food Poverty Line (FPL) which "includes a daily intake of 2,100 calories per adult per day."

Non-food Basic Needs 
While the HIES found that Nauru is doing well in terms of food poverty, 24% of the population and 16.8% of households are below the basic needs (clothing, shelter, education, transport, communication, water, sanitation and health services) poverty line. This is the worst poverty index of all Pacific nations. In 2017, half of Nauruans were living on $9,000 a year. Water resources are extremely limited, with the island supplying enough for 32 liters of freshwater per person per day despite the WHO's recommendation of 50 liters per person per day. Much of the groundwater has been contaminated by mining runoff, toilets, and dumping of other commercial and household wastes, causing Nauruans to rely on imported water, the price of which can vary as it is closely tied to fuel prices for its delivery, and rainfall storage. Access to sanitation facilities is restricted with just 66% of residents having access to reliable toilets, and open defecation is still practiced by 3% of the population. Schools are frequently forced to close because they do not have reliable toilets or drinking water for students to use. There is a long-standing truancy problem and accessibility of education for refugee and asylum-seeking children, as well as for disabled children remain areas of concern for Nauru’s education sector.

Effects of mining on Nauruans and their land

Land and people 
Since the early 1900s, Nauru has been mined for phosphorus by many countries, resulting in devastating destruction of the land. As noted earlier, 80% of the island is unusable due to phosphorus mining, which has left exposed coral pinnacles that leave the land useless and uninhabitable. The degradation of the land has resulted in a "lower resilience of the natural environment," causing many negative health and environmental effects, like poor water quality, greater erosion rates, poor precipitation, higher droughts, and greater CO2 emissions. The damage done through mining extends further by ocean acidification and coastal erosion and has threatened terrestrial and marine biodiversity. The people of Nauru also face continued negative health effects from the mining in the form of phosphate dust pollution and cadmium pollution, tainting the water and air quality. As a result, the rate of care-seeking for children under 5 years of age with ARI is 69% according to UNICEF data. Due to the extent of the mining, there is not much that can be done now to alleviate the agricultural problems that Nauruans face besides monetary reparations, which Nauru pursued from the Australian Government in 1989 though the International Court of Justice in the Hague. The lawsuit was settled in 1993 in an out-of-court payout of $120 million AUD over 20 years.

Phosphate mining has removed most of the vegetation and tree coverage that Nauru had, leaving the land and the people vulnerable to intense heat on an island so close to the Equator. The effects of the vegetation removal has been most felt by refugees in the Nauru detention center, which is in the very center of the island where the majority of the mining is done. Along the coast, where most Nauruans are forced to live now due to the land reduction caused by mining, the coastal plants that remain are vital for the "provision of shade and animal and plant habitats; protection from wind, erosion, flood, and salt water incursion; land stabilization; protection from the desiccating effects of salt spray; and soil improvement and mulching," especially as the coast is expected to continue eroding with the increasing effects of climate change.

Social effects 
Because phosphate mining, and now deep-sea mining, has been going on for so long, it is hard to parse out exactly how it has affected the Nauruan people. Researchers have offered that the Nauruan people likely have a loss of their sense of place and culture, as they did not have full control of their land until 1968. There has also been a documented loss of Nauruan traditions like subsistence farming as well as the violations of their rights to their own land and the continued human rights violations that continue at the Nauru detention center. The Nauruan people face extremely high rates of obesity, alcoholism, prostitution, poorer mental health rates, and myriad other health issues that stem from these problems. A study done in 2014 by The Nauru Family Health and Support Study implemented by Nauru Department of Home Affairs and DFAT and United Nations Population Fund (UNFPA) have shown the alarming prevalence of violence in romantic relationships on the island, with 48.1% of ever-partnered women who participated saying that have experienced physical or sexual violence at least once. A quarter of women in the same study have experienced violence in at least one pregnancy, and 9.9% of women had experienced some form of violence in the past 12 months. In another study surveying sexual health, 21% of a portion of the population tested positive for chlamydia. In the same survey, 30% of school children aged 13–15 reported having attempted suicide, and 24% of children under the age of five are stunted. Though Nauruans are currently still searching for a way to stay on the island and live viable lives, some speculate that the only way for them to do so is to continue mining the phosphorus that is left (30 years or so).

See also 
Index of Nauru-related articles
Outline of Nauru
ISO 3166-2:NR
Micronesia
Island country

Notes

References

Citations

Sources

Further reading 
Storr, C. (2020). International Status in the Shadow of Empire: Nauru and the Histories of International Law. Cambridge: Cambridge University Press.

External links 
Government of Nauru
Government of Nauru (archived site)
Nauru. The World Factbook. Central Intelligence Agency.

Nauru from UCB Libraries GovPubs
Nauru profile from the BBC News Online

 
1968 establishments in Nauru
British Western Pacific Territories
Republics in the Commonwealth of Nations
Countries in Micronesia
English-speaking countries and territories
Former British colonies and protectorates in Oceania
Former German colonies
Island countries
Member states of the Commonwealth of Nations
Member states of the United Nations
Small Island Developing States
States and territories established in 1968
Countries in Oceania